William Charles Dalley (18 November 1901 – 9 February 1989) was a New Zealand rugby union player. He became a specialist halfback in 1924, and was quickly selected for the New Zealand national side, the All Blacks, that year. Between then and 1929 he played 35 matches for the All Blacks including five internationals. He captained the side in his final two appearances in 1929. In all he scored five tries for the All Blacks. After retiring as a player, Dalley served as a member of the Canterbury Rugby Union's management committee from 1932 to 1955, the last three years as chairman.

References

1901 births
1989 deaths
People educated at Christchurch Boys' High School
New Zealand rugby union players
New Zealand international rugby union players
Canterbury rugby union players
Rugby union scrum-halves
New Zealand referees and umpires
Rugby union players from Canterbury, New Zealand